The National Wrestling Alliance (NWA) is an American professional wrestling promotion. NWA personnel consists of professional wrestlers, commentators, ring announcers, rappers and various other positions. Executive officers are also listed.

NWA personnel appear on the weekly Powerrr and USA programs, pay-per-view events, and live events.

Roster

Male wrestlers

Female wrestlers

Other on-air personnel

Broadcast team

Referees

Backstage personnel

See also 
Lists of professional wrestling personnel

References

External links
 Official NWA website
 Official NWA YouTube channel
 Official NWA Facebook page

 
National Wrestling Alliance